The Challenge: War of the Worlds is the thirty-third season of the MTV reality competition series The Challenge. This season featured alumni from The Real World, The Challenge, Are You the One?, The Bachelor Canada, The Bachelorette, Big Brother, Celebrity Big Brother UK, Love Island UK, Survivor Turkey, American Ninja Warrior, Party Down South, Geordie Shore, Ex on the Beach (Brazil, U.S., and UK), Telemundo, and Floribama Shore competing for a share of a $1 million prize. The season had a "Basic Training" launch special on January 30, 2019, and premiered on February 6, 2019 on MTV.

This is the first edition of the War of the Worlds series, with War of the Worlds 2 following in the fall of 2019.

Contestants

Draft selections

Format
This season featured 16  Challenge veterans and 18 prospects - new  Challenge competitors from around the world. For the first ten episodes, the players competed in male/female pairs. Each veteran player paired with a prospect of the opposite sex. The Prospect picked their alumni partner based on the finish order of the opening "Impending Dune" challenge. Once in their pairs, the main phase of the game began. The main elements of the game are as follows:

Daily Missions: Each round the pairs will compete in the daily challenge. The top 3 pairs are immune from elimination and form the Tribunal for that round of play. 
Tribunal: The Tribunal will collectively nominate three pairs to nominate for the elimination round. The nominated pairs then face the Tribunal's interrogation with each nominee having the chance to plea their case as to why they should not be voted-in to the elimination.
Eliminations (The Killing Floor): At "The Killing Floor", the members of the tribunal each individually and publicly vote for a nominated pair to enter the elimination round. The nominated team must then call-out any non-immune pair, challenging them to the elimination. The losing pair is eliminated from the game, while the winner stays in the game and is given "The Relic" - which awards them immunity in the next round of play.

During the 10th episode of the season, the 7 remaining pairs were disbanded, with the 14 remaining players playing the rest of the competition as individuals - with players competing in challenges as individuals and eliminated as individuals. The game format remains mostly the same, but with each round of play being designated as a male or female round and only players of the designated gender are at risk of being eliminated, but any player can be part of that round's Tribunal. Additionally, the relic is no longer awarded to an individual elimination winner.

When eight players remain, they will compete individually in the Final Challenge for their share of the $1,000,000 prize. First place will receive $750,000. Second place will receive $200,000, and third place will receive $50,000. The other five, receive nothing.

Twists
Purge: Some challenges will be designated as a Purge challenge - sudden death challenges the losers are immediately eliminated. Two Purge challenge were held during the game: 
 In the "Impending Dune" challenge, the worst finishing male and female prospect were eliminated before pairs were drafted. 
 In the "Judgement Day" challenge, the worst finishing male and female were eliminated in the Penultimate Challenge of the game.
Double Elimination: The "Ring Tossed" challenge was a Double Elimination in which three teams competed and four players were eliminated (opposed to the normal two players). The pair called-out by the nominated pair must also call-out a third pair - meaning 3 teams would compete to stay in the game. Then the three players of each gender will compete against each other in the elimination and only the winner of each gendered heat remaining in the game. Should members of two different pairs win their gendered-heat, they will form a new pair and continue in the game, while their original partner is eliminated.

Gameplay

Challenge games
 Impending Dune: Played in separate male/female heats, players must race down a sand dune and retrieve a ball that has rolled down from the top of the dune. Players must then race back to the top of the dune with a ball to retrieve puzzle pieces, then race back down with their puzzle pieces to the bottom of the dune to a puzzle station. There are two more Prospects than Veterans — one male and one female, so the last-place finishers of each heat are eliminated from the competition.
Winners: Paulie & Da'Vonne
Eliminated: Josh & Liz
 Arms-a-geddon Tired: Played in two heats of 5 minutes each, each team competes against another team in a tug-of-war. Each rope is 400 ft. long, after the 5 minutes is over, each competitor's length of rope will be combined with their partner's which forms their team's total length. The three teams with the longest combined length of rope will form the Tribunal. 
Winners: Cara Maria & Theo, Bananas & Morgan, and Amanda & Josh
 Search & Destroy: Played in 4 heats, competitors must retrieve a hidden ball in a stone graveyard and return it to their partner. Their partner must then go through a mud pit and other competitors to reach the safe zone so that their team can move on to the next heat. After each heat, 3 teams will be eliminated from the mission, as the number of balls hidden, decreases. The last three teams who make it through all 4 heats will form the Tribunal. 
Winners: Paulie & Natalie D., Wes & Dee, and Kam & Ashley C.
 Fallout: Played one team at a time, competitors must race to touch a floating buoy across an elevated obstacle. Each team must select one person to build momentum on a pendulous rod and one to jump. The fastest three teams to reach the buoy formed the tribunal.
Winners: Paulie & Natalie D., Nany & Turbo, and Hunter & Georgia
 Tired Out: Chained together, each team must race 200 yards across the desert to their stack of color-coded tires. They must then climb up a sand dune to an answer key of a tire pyramid they have to assemble. After they have memorized the answer key, they have to pick out a tire and race back to the starting line with that tire in order to build the pyramid. 14 tires are needed to complete the pyramid. The first three teams to complete the pyramid correctly will form the Tribunal.
Winners: Paulie & Natalie D., Nany & Turbo, and Cara Maria & Theo
 Doom Buggy: Played two people at a time, each contestant must climb across ten tires and unhook them while being dragged across the desert at 30 kilometers per hour. The three teams to unhook the most tires will form the Tribunal.
Winners: Hunter & Georgia, Wes & Dee, and Kyle & Mattie
 Eye in the Sky: Played two teams at a time, each team has one member blindfolded and another wearing a VR device that shows footage from the blindfolded teammate's perspective. The blindfolded partner must guide their partner across an elevated platform. The three teams with the fastest time form the Tribunal.
Winners: Wes & Dee, Jenna & Gus, and Da'Vonne & Bear
 Brain Freeze: Each team member alternates running 100 yards into the freezing ocean water to retrieve a puzzle piece, and bringing it back to their puzzle station. They are a total of eight puzzle pieces that need to be retrieved. Once they have retrieved all eight pieces, the teams can then begin to solve their puzzle tower. The first three teams to solve their puzzle tower correctly will form the Tribunal.
Winners: Wes & Dee, Nany & Turbo, and Cara Maria & Theo
 Road Warrior: Played one team at a time, competitors must swing back and forth on top of two semi-trucks moving at 50 mph transferring rings over to their partner. There are sixteen rings total and the three teams who transfer the most rings the fastest will form the Tribunal.
Winners: Hunter & Georgia, Kyle & Mattie, and Cara Maria & Theo
 Fandemonium: There is a giant 150-foot hallway that has balls at one end of it. There will be 3 giant hurricane fans that will blast wind at the players. The three fastest players that deposit their balls in 5 minutes will form the Tribunal.
Winners: Paulie, Theo, and Turbo
Highway to Hell: Players will be put on the roof of a car that is on a track, drifting. On top of the car is a puzzle. The 3 fastest players who finish the puzzle within a 3-minute time limit will win the challenge and form the Tribunal.
Winners: Mattie, Wes, and Dee
Day of Wreckoning: In teams of two, each duo will run to the nearby junkyard to collect trash. Once they have done so, they will run back to their dumpster to deposit their junk. The three teams who transfers the heaviest junk in one hour will form the Tribunal.
Winners: Paulie & Georgia, Turbo & Natalie D., and Da'Vonne & Wes
Crash Landing: Players will be placed on a rotating airplane and attempt to solve a puzzle the fastest. Once they are done, they will jump off the plane and into the water. The first male and female to do so will earn their spot in the final and the first three players will form the Tribunal.
Winners: Turbo, Cara Maria, and Paulie
Immune to Finals: Turbo and Cara Maria
Judgement Day: Players must start on one of three containers. Once the challenge starts, players must run and jump off the first container into the water and swim around a buoy and then climbing up the second container. Once on the second container, players must rope swing to the third container. On the third container, which is at a severe angle,  players must grab a ring and slide down the container, back into the water and swim back to the second. They must climb up the second container and place a ring around a pole. The last placing guy and girl are eliminated.
Winners: N/A
Eliminated: Paulie & Da'Vonne

Killing Floor games
Drone Ball Drop: Played in female and male heats, a drone will drop a ball into a ring and players would run to get the ball and take it across to their basket to score a point. The first team to score two points will win.
Played by: Hunter & Georgia vs. Ashley M. & Chase
Map It Out: Played for 15 minutes, each team is given the flags of twenty countries. As one competitor hands the flags to their partner, their partner must climb a rock climbing wall that is a map of the world and place the flag on the correct country. The team that has the most correctly placed flags, after the 15 minutes, will win. 
Played by: Bananas & Morgan vs. Zach & Zahida
Ring Tossed: Played individually, each competitor must wrestle two of three rings from the other two competitors in their round. The first guy and girl will win and form a team together. 
Played by: Mattie vs. Natalie N. vs. Julia & Kyle vs. JP vs. CT
Lights Out: Both teams will run into a black box to assemble a puzzle. At random intervals, host T.J. Lavin will shut the lights out in the boxes, forcing one player to run back and switch the lights on again so that the teams can continue assembling the puzzle. The first team to assemble the puzzle and ring the bell wins.
Played by: Zach & Zahida vs. Wes & Dee
Sandbag Burn: Each team will have to transfer 40 heavy sandbags each across to their teammate by dragging a sled. The amount of weight per sled is up to the players. The first team to successfully transfer all the sandbags to their teammate wins.
Played by: Da'Vonne & Bear vs. Leroy & Shaleen
Uphill Battle: Both teams must use a rung to climb a large ramp. As they get higher, the ramp gets wider, making it difficult to climb up without the support of their teammate. If one team falls first, the second team only has to cross the highest point the first team cleared. The first team to reach the top or to the other team's highest point wins.
Played by: Amanda & Josh vs. Kam & Ashley C.
Push & Pole: Players begin at the center of a circle and are asked to place both hands on an iron pole. The first contestant to wrestle the pole out of their opponent's hands earns a point for their team. Played in gendered heats, the first team to win three points wins.
Played by: Da'Vonne & Bear vs. Jenna & Gus
Wheel of Death: One team member will be strapped to a spinning wheel giving directions to their partner, who is blindfolded, on a puzzle board. The goal is to properly place the matching symbols of a puzzle key onto the board in the correct order. If one of the symbols is not right-side up, it will not be counted. The first team to match all the symbols correctly wins.
Played by: Paulie & Natalie D. vs. Kam & Ashley C.
King of the World: TJ will ask a series of question that the players must answer. There will be five balls with answers hanging above the Killing Floor with only one ball having the correct answer. When the balls drop, players must find the correct answer to the question and deposit it into their goal. The first person to win three points wins.
Played by: Kyle vs. Bear
Chair'd Remains: Players will each call out one player to tie up their opponent onto a chair, by using duct tape. TJ will then blow the horn to stop the tapers. On go, the players will attempt to break off their tape and ring the bell behind them. The first person to ring the bell wins.
Played by: Georgia vs. Nany
Hall Brawl: Players must run through a narrow hallway past another contestant to ring a bell. The player who rings the bell first in the best two out of three rounds wins the elimination. 
Played by: Kyle vs. Theo
Tug O' War: Players will be connected to a long rope that their opponent will be pulling through a wall. Once the slack in the rope goes, players will be able to pull off their opponents from their platform. The first player to knock off their opponent wins.
Played by: Dee vs. Da'Vonne

Final Challenge
The final challenge, The Death Path, was competed by the remaining eight players individually. The path was over 50 miles long. Each player's individual times were recorded and added up to determine the winner of the season at the end of the final. During the final, competitors were eliminated until four remaining competitors crossed the finish line where the results were announced.

Day one
First Leg: Players begin the final by running and cycling through a six-mile loop four times (24 miles overall). In the middle of the figure-eight loop there are five checkpoints each player must complete. Players can complete checkpoints at any stage during the 24 miles. If the checkpoint they wish to complete is currently occupied, they may wait, or continue with their 24 miles. Each checkpoint has a 20-minute time limit before players time out. Unbeknownst to the players, the Top 3 players of this stage would form the Tribunal for an Instant Elimination. 
Checkpoints
On Point: Players stand behind a starting line and throw one ring onto each hook pointing out from a board.
Pyramid Scheme: Players must complete a 5x5 grid puzzle so that each row and column has one of each color.
Rampage: Players push a ball to the top of a ramp and into a basket using a provided pole.
Skulled Out: Players must complete a vertical puzzle to form a picture of a skull.
So Rolled: Players stand behind a startling line and roll a tire through a hole.
Tribunal: Theo, Turbo & Wes
Eliminated: Georgia (8th place — DQ), Mattie (7th place — Quit)

Instant Elimination - Walk Tiny: Players hold on to a 50-foot rope that is connected to a monster truck. The truck slowly drives thus taking the players on a walk. The first person to fall or drop the rope would be eliminated.
Played by: Hunter vs. Natalie D.
Winner: Natalie D.
Eliminated: Hunter (6th place)

Day two
Geography Trivia: Players are asked a series of multiple-choice geography trivia questions. If they answer a question incorrectly, they would be eliminated from the checkpoint. The last player standing would be driven for the first mile of the Second Leg in a dune buggy while the remaining four players must traverse the sand dunes on foot.
Winner: Cara Maria

Second leg: Players had to travel on foot over a series of sand dunes, completing the checkpoints that the players encounter.
Battle Ball: Players must wait for the next player to arrive. The two players place colored balls one at a time into a slot attempting to line four balls in a row (similar to Connect Four).  The first player to line up four of their colored balls in a row is allowed to continue while the loser must wait for the next player to arrive to play again. The player who loses the final battle will receive a five minute time penalty, which must be served before continuing.
Eating: The first player to arrive at the checkpoint may eat as much or as little of the provided food items as they like. Once finished, they must divide up the remaining plates of food among the remaining four players. Once the remaining players reach the checkpoint, they must eat everything they have been assigned before continuing.

Final leg: Players run five miles down a beach to reach four kayaks. Along the way, there is a math problem they must solve to unlock a kayak and paddle towards a boat wreck. As there are only four kayaks, the remaining player without a kayak will be eliminated. From the boat wreck, the remaining four players run down the beach to a lighthouse where the finish line is set up. Once the final four players have reached the finish line, their total times will be added together to determine the winner of War of the Worlds.
Eliminated: Cara Maria (5th place)

Final results
Winner: Turbo ($750,000)
Runner-up: Theo ($200,000)
Third place: Wes ($50,000)
Fourth place: Natalie D. ($0)

Game summary

Elimination progress

Competition
 The contestant completed the final challenge and won
 The contestant completed the final challenge and lost
 The contestant did not complete the final challenge
 The contestant/team won the daily challenge, was in the Tribunal, and was safe from elimination
 The contestants placed first in the second-to-last challenge, automatically qualified for the final, and was in the tribunal
 The contestant won the daily challenge, but was not in the Tribunal
 The contestant was safe from elimination by the Relic
 The contestant was safe from elimination by the Relic, won the challenge and was in the Tribunal
 The contestant was nominated by the Tribunal for the Killing Floor, but was not selected
 The contestant was not selected to go into elimination
 The contestant won in the Killing Floor
 The contestant lost in the Killing Floor and was eliminated
 The contestant was removed from the competition due to medical reasons
 The contestant withdrew from the competition
 The contestant was eliminated at the challenge

Team selections

Voting history

Episodes

Reunion special
The two part reunion special aired on May 29, 2019 and was hosted by WWE pro wrestler, The Real World: Back to New York alum, and former Challenge champion Mike "The Miz" Mizanin and Olympian and The Challenge: Champs vs. Pros alumna Lolo Jones. Cast members attended in London, England. The first part received 0.55 million viewers along with a 0.3 18–49 demo rating, the second part dropped slightly to 0.50 million but matched the demo rating.

Controversy
Cast member Amanda Garcia claimed on her social media that fellow castmates Johnny Devenanzio, Theo Campbell and Kyle Christie used tape to cover her mouth and tie her against her will after an argument. Paulie Calafiore and Da'Vonne Rogers spoke about what allegedly happened, calling the incident "disturbing". A petition was also launched, demanding the network to release the unaired footage. The situation was addressed in the second part of the reunion special.

Notes

References

External links
 

2019 American television seasons
War of the Worlds, The Challenge
Television shows set in Namibia
Television shows filmed in Namibia